Pauline Coatanea (born 6 July 1993) is a French handball player who plays for Brest Bretagne Handball and the French national team as a right wing.

Achievements

Club

International 

 EHF Champions League
 Finalist: 2021 (with Brest Bretagne Handball)

Domestic 

 French league:
 Winner : 2021 (with Brest Bretagne Handball)
 Runner up: 2022 (with Brest Bretagne Handball)
 Tied 1st: 2020 (with Brest Bretagne Handball)

 French Cup (Coupe de France):
 Winner : 2018 and 2021 (with Brest Bretagne Handball)
 Runner up: 2019 (with Brest Bretagne Handball)

 French Women's League Cup Championship (Coupe de la Ligue):
 Runner up: 2011 (with Arvor 29)
 French 2nd division league (Division 2 Féminine):
 Winner : 2013 (with Nantes Loire Atlantique Handball)

National team 

 Olympic Games
 2020: 

 European Championship
 2018: 
 2020: 
 2022: 4th
 Junior competitions
 10th at the European Women's U-19 Handball Championship in 2011
  at the IHF Women's Junior World Championship (U20) in 2012

Individual awards
 All-Star Team Right Wing of the Junior World Championship: 2012
Championnat de France: 
Best Right Wing: 2018, 2020
7 Majeur de la semaine (Best 7 Players of the week): Day 8 & 10 of Season 2018/19

Honors 

 Inducted into the Legion of Honor with the rank of Chevalier: 2021

References

External links

French female handball players
1993 births
Living people
People from Saint-Renan
Sportspeople from Finistère
European champions for France
Handball players at the 2020 Summer Olympics
Medalists at the 2020 Summer Olympics
Olympic medalists in handball
Olympic gold medalists for France